Parklawn is a census-designated place (CDP) in Stanislaus County, California. The 2010 United States census reported Parklawn's population was 1,337.

Geography
According to the United States Census Bureau, the CDP covers an area of 0.2 square miles (0.4 km), all of it land.

Demographics
The 2010 United States Census reported that Parklawn had a population of 1,337. The racial makeup of Parklawn was 673 (50.3%) White, 24 (1.8%) African American, 22 (1.6%) Native American, 7 (0.5%) Asian, 0 (0.0%) Pacific Islander, 541 (40.5%) from other races, and 70 (5.2%) from two or more races. Hispanic or Latino of any race were 1,090 persons (81.5%).

The Census reported that 1,337 people (100% of the population) lived in households, 0 (0%) lived in non-institutionalized group quarters, and 0 (0%) were institutionalized.

There were 319 households, out of which 185 (58.0%) had children under the age of 18 living in them, 162 (50.8%) were opposite-sex married couples living together, 73 (22.9%) had a female householder with no husband present, 37 (11.6%) had a male householder with no wife present.  There were 41 (12.9%) unmarried opposite-sex partnerships, and 1 (0.3%) same-sex married couples or partnerships. 33 households (10.3%) were made up of individuals, and 12 (3.8%) had someone living alone who was 65 years of age or older. The average household size was 4.19.  There were 272 families (85.3% of all households); the average family size was 4.32.

The population was spread out, with 457 people (34.2%) under the age of 18, 188 people (14.1%) aged 18 to 24, 343 people (25.7%) aged 25 to 44, 262 people (19.6%) aged 45 to 64, and 87 people (6.5%) who were 65 years of age or older.  The median age was 26.4 years. For every 100 females, there were 96.6 males.  For every 100 females age 18 and over, there were 101.8 males.

The homeowner vacancy rate was 1.3%; the rental vacancy rate was 6.9%.  663 people (49.6% of the population) lived in owner-occupied housing units and 674 people (50.4%) lived in rental housing units.

References

Census-designated places in Stanislaus County, California
Census-designated places in California